was a  after Ninji and before Hoji. This period spanned the years from February 1243 to February 1247.

Change of era
 ; 1243: The new era name was created to mark an event or a number of events. The previous era ended and a new one commenced in Ninji 4.

Events of the Kangen era
 1244 (Kangen 2): In the spring of this year, a number of extraordinary phenomena in the skies over Kamakura troubled Yoritsune deeply.
 1244 (Kangen 2, 4th month): Yoritsune's son, Yoritsugu, had his coming-of-age ceremonies at age six. In the same month, Yoritsune asked Emperor Go-Saga for permission to give up his responsibilities as shōgun in favor of his son, Kujō Yoritsugu.
 September 11, 1245 (Kangen 3, 7th month):  Yoshitsune shaved his head and became a Buddhist priest.
 1246 (Kangen 4, 7th month): Yoritsune's son, now Shōgun Yoritsugu (who is only 7 years old) marries the sister of Hōjō Tsunetoki (who is himself only 16 years old).
 1246 (Kangen 4): In the 4th year of Go-Saga-tennōs reign (後嵯峨天皇4年), he abdicated; and despite the succession (senso) was received by his 4-year-old son. Shortly thereafter, Emperor Go-Fukakusa is said to have acceded to the throne (sokui).

Notes

References
 Nussbaum, Louis-Frédéric and Käthe Roth. (2005).  Japan encyclopedia. Cambridge: Harvard University Press. ;  OCLC 58053128
 Titsingh, Isaac. (1834). Nihon Odai Ichiran; ou,  Annales des empereurs du Japon.  Paris: Royal Asiatic Society, Oriental Translation Fund of Great Britain and Ireland. OCLC 5850691
 Varley, H. Paul. (1980). A Chronicle of Gods and Sovereigns: Jinnō Shōtōki of Kitabatake Chikafusa. New York: Columbia University Press. ;  OCLC 6042764

External links
 National Diet Library, "The Japanese Calendar" -- historical overview plus illustrative images from library's collection

Japanese eras
1240s in Japan